Atractosteus is a genus of gars in the family Lepisosteidae, with three species. The genus first appeared in the Campanian in the Late Cretaceous.

Systematics

Species

Extant species

Fossils
 †Atractosteus africanus (Arambourg & Joleaud, 1943)
 †Atractosteus grandei (Brownstein & Lyson, 2022)
 †Atractosteus cuneatus (Cope 1884) non (Cope 1878) 
 †Atractosteus emmonsi Hay 1929
 †Atractosteus falipoui (Cavin & Brito 2001) 
 †Atractosteus lapidosus Hay 1919
 †Atractosteus messelensis Grande 2010
 †Atractosteus occidentalis (Leidy 1856) non Wiley 1976 
 †Atractosteus simplex (Leidy 1873)

References

 

Lepisosteidae
Taxa named by Constantine Samuel Rafinesque